The North American X-15's Flight 188 on October 3, 1967, was a record-setting flight.

History 
Flight 188 used North American Aviation X-15 Number 2 aircraft, number 56-6671, 2A-F12. The X-15, model X-15A-2 had many modifications from the original X-15A. The X-15 number 2 on, flight 74, was damaged during landing on November 9, 1962, and was repaired and updated to become the X15A-2. The X-15A-2 fuselage was lengthened . This new space was designed for a liquid hydrogen fuel tank. The liquid hydrogen was to feed a scramjet engine that was flown but not used. The dummy scramjet was mounted on the ventral fin of the X-15A-2. Two external drop tanks were added to increase fuel by 75%. The tanks held liquid ammonia and liquid oxygen. The external tanks provided 60 seconds of additional engine burn. The added tanks added  to the X-15. The internal and external tanks held about 7 tons of fuel. To handle the heat of atmospheric entry, the entire surface of the X-15A-2 was covered in Martin MA-25S ablative heat shield. The ablative heat shield was designed to char and slowly break away, carrying away heat in the process. The Martin MA-25S was pink in color, then a white top coat sealer was applied on top of the Martin MA-25S. After the flight, it was found that the craft had heat damage that was not economical to repair after some repairs were completed. During landing, the scramjet broke off due to heat damage. Flight 188 landed on Rogers Dry Lake in California after a flight time of 8 minutes and 17.0 seconds.

Flight 188 was the 53rd flight for X-15 Number 2 and the 5th flight as the modified X-15A-2. The X-15A-2 used a reaction Motors XLR99 engine by the Reaction Motors Division of Thiokol Chemical Company. William J. Knight was a test pilot for the United States Air Force and NASA. The X-15A-2 Number 2 was the only X-15 to have the external tank modifications. Because of heat damage, the scramjet broke loose and fell away from the X-15A-2. 
The dummy scramjet was fitted for speed testing, the goal was to have real flight test and compare this with the wind tunnel testing. Due to the damage, limited test data was collected. The scramjet was found on Edwards Air Force Base's bombing range. The breakaway did not affect the landing of the X-15A-2. During the landing at Mach 5.5 the X-15A-2 gave an over-temperature warning in the XLR-99 engine bay. For fire safety and to lighten the X15A-2, Knight tried to jettison remain fuel in the internal fuel tank. But, the heat had damaged the fuel jettison system. The X-15A-2 was able to jettisonable lower fin, needed for landing. Knight was able to land the heavier than normal X15A-2 at a faster than normal speed safely. At Edwards Air Force Base two radio relay stations and six emergency landing strips were built on the dry lake beds. Touchdown was at 14:40:07 local time at Edwards Air Force Base after 342.79 (213 miles) of flight. Total engine burn time was 2 minutes and 20 seconds. North American F-100 Super Sabre, Lockheed F-104 Starfighter and Douglas F5D Skylancer jets were used as chase planes, that tailed the X15A-2 as long as it could at launch and also as the X15A-2 landed. The F-100 Super Sabre and F5D had a top speed of Mach 1.4. The F-104 had top speed Mach 2.

Flight 188's take-off was delayed by some minor problems that were fixed. A modified Boeing B-52 Stratofortress, model NB-52B, was used to take the X-15A-2 to height. The NB-52B, NASA Balls 8, carried the X-15A-2 under the right wing. Balls 8 carried 106 of the 199 X-15 program flights. The external tanks were jettisoned 67.4 seconds after launch at a speed of Mach 2.0 and 70,000 feet. The total engine burn time during the flight was 141.4 seconds. After Flight 188, 11 other X15s would fly before the program was retired. The X15 program data was used in the planning of future aircraft and spacecraft designs.

Flight 188 held the crewed winged spaceplane speed record till it was passed by STS-1 of the Space Shuttle Columbia on April 14, 1981. Flight 188 is still a speed record for a non-orbital aircraft in the atmosphere under a powered manned flight. Knight was awarded the Harmon International Aviation Trophy in 1969 for his record setting flight by President Lyndon Johnson. Knight would fly three more X15s, Flights: 194, 196 and 198.

X-15A-2 Number 2 aircraft was taken to the National Museum of the United States Air Force in Dayton, Ohio and is on permanent display. The X-15A-2 was repainted for the display.

Flight 188
X-15A-2, modified X-15, external tanks and ablative coating
Gross mass: 
Unfuelled mass: 
Specific impulse: 276 
Craft length 
Craft Height: 
Craft Diameter: 
Wing Span: 
Apogee: 342.79 (213 miles)
Reaction Motors XLR99-RM-2 engine, Burn time: 90 seconds on internal fuel
Thrust: 262.445 kN (59,000 lbf)
Engine about 600,000-horsepower
Fuel: liquid-fuelled: liquid oxygen and anhydrous ammonia
Total fuel: 
Max speed Mach 6.70, a speed record
External tank: Gross Mass: 
External tank: Empty Mass: 
External tank: Diameter: 
External tank: Span: 
External tank: Length: 
External tanks: Burn time 60 seconds, External fuel
External tanks: 6,814 liters (1,800 gallons)
Glide time: 6 min., 10 seconds
Peak surface temperature over 
XMC-2 pressure suit

X-15A2 Number 2 flights with external tanks
Flight 155 – November 3, 1965, with empty external tanks, pilot Robert A. Rushworth, Mach 2.31, 5 minutes, 2 seconds
Flight 159 – July 1, 1966, pilot Rushworth (last flight), Mach 1.70, 4 minutes, 29 seconds
Flight 175 – November 18, 1966, pilot Knight, Mach 6.33, 8 minutes, 27 seconds, second fastest flight
Flight 186 – August 21, 1967, with full ablative coating. pilot Knight, Mach 4.94, 7 minutes, 39 seconds
Flight 188 – October 3, 1967, with dummy Ram-Jet and ablative coating, pilot Knight, Mach 6.70, 8 minutes, 12 seconds

See also

List of X-15 flights
Reaction Motors XLR11
Scramjet programs

External links
youtube.com X-15A-2
 Reaction Motors XLR99 Rocket – National Museum of the United States Air Force
 XLR-99
NASA
X-15: Hypersonic Research at the Edge of Space
Hypersonics Before the Shuttle: A Concise History of the X-15 Research Airplane

Non-NASA
X-15A at Encyclopedia Astronautica
X-15: Advanced Research Airplane, design summary by North America Aviation

References

Flight 188
X-15 Flight 188
X-15 Flight 188
188